Green Eyes most commonly refers to:
 Green-eyed, a human eye color
It may also refer to:

Music
 "Green Eyes (Aquellos Ojos Verdes)", a 1929 popular song
 "Green Eyes", a 1985 song by Hüsker Dü from their album Flip Your Wig
 "Green Eyes", a 1997 song by Nick Cave and the Bad Seeds from their album The Boatman's Call
 "Green Eyes", a 2000 song by Erykah Badu from her album Mama's Gun
 "Green Eyes", a 2002 song by Coldplay from their album A Rush of Blood to the Head
 "Green Eyes", a 2006 song by Joe Purdy from his album You Can Tell Georgia
 "Green Eyes", a 2007 song by Akeboshi from his album Meet Along the Way
 "Green Eyes", a 2010 song by Wavves from their album King of the Beach
 "Green Eyes", a 2021 song by Arlo Parks from her album Collapsed in Sunbeams

Film
 Green Eyes (1918 film), a silent drama film directed by Roy William Neill
 Green Eyes (1934 film), an American film directed by Richard Thorpe
 Green Eyes (1977 film), an American TV movie
 The Green Eyed, a 2015 Nigerian film directed by Blessing O. Uduefe

Literature
 Green Eyes, a book by Lucius Shepard
 Green Eyes, a book by Karen Robards

Other
 Greeneye, a family of deep-sea fish
 Green Eyes, a one-act play by Tennessee Williams